Homicide is a 1949 American crime drama film directed by Felix Jacoves and written by William Sackheim. The film stars Robert Douglas, Helen Westcott, Robert Alda, Monte Blue, Warren Douglas and John Harmon. The film was released by Warner Bros. on April 2, 1949.

Plot
Police Lt. Michael Landers suspects that a suicide at a local flop house is not what it appears to be. When his boss doesn't share his suspicions, Landers takes a leave of absence and travels to a desert spa town in order to investigate the death. At his hotel, he strikes up a romance with the pretty cigarette counter girl, Jo Ann.

Cast
 Robert Douglas as Police Lt. Michael Landers
 Helen Westcott as Jo Ann Rice
 Robert Alda as Andy
 Monte Blue as Sheriff George
 Warren Douglas as Brad Clifton
 John Harmon as Pete Kimmel
 James Flavin as Det. Lt. Boylan

Reception
According to Warner Bros records the film earned $334,000 domestically and $172,000 foreign.

References

External links
 

1949 films
Warner Bros. films
1940s crime comedy-drama films
Films scored by William Lava
American crime comedy-drama films
American black-and-white films
1940s English-language films
1940s American films